Or Dadia (or Dadya, ; born ) is an Israeli footballer who plays as a right-back for Israeli Premier League club Hapoel Be'er Sheva.

Early life
Dadid was born in Be'er Sheva, Israel, to a Jewish family. He served as a soldier in the Israel Defense Forces.

Career

Early career
Dadia grew up in the youth departments of Maccabi Be'er Sheva and Hapoel Be'er Sheva. On May 15, 2017, the 2016–17 season, he made his debut in Hapoel Be'er Sheva senior team in a 1–1 draw against Beitar Jerusalem at Teddy Stadium. On May 20 made his second appearance in a 0–2 win over Bnei Sakhnin at Turner Stadium, he won the championship with his team.

In the season of 2017–18, Dadia was loaned to Hapoel Bnei Lod from the Liga Leumit for two years. On August 8, 2017, he made his debut in the Toto Cup 4–1 loss to Hapoel Tel Aviv at Lod Municipal Stadium. On August 21 he made his debut as part of the Liga Leumit, winning 0–2 at Ironi Nesher at Lod Municipal Stadium. By the end of the season he had made 24 league appearances and finished with his team in tenth place. In the 2018–19 season, he finished ninth in the Liga Leumit with his team and made 31 league appearances and scored one goal.

International career
Dadia made his debut for the Israel national football team on 27 September 2022 in a friendly game against Malta.

Career statistics

Honours

Club
Hapoel Be'er Sheva 
 Israeli Premier League (1): 2016–17
 Israel State Cup: 2019–20, 2021–22
Israel Super Cup: 2022

See also 
 List of Jewish footballers
 List of Jews in sports
 List of Israelis

References

External links

1997 births
Living people
Israeli footballers
Israel international footballers
Israeli Jews
Footballers from Beersheba
Jewish footballers
Association football wingers
Association football forwards
Hapoel Be'er Sheva F.C. players
Hapoel Bnei Lod F.C. players
Israeli Premier League players
Liga Leumit players